Stephen Andrew Cheek (born April 18, 1977) is a former punter in the National Football League who played for the Kansas City Chiefs.

Steve served as the head coach of the senior elite division Argonautes of Aix-en-Provence. The Argonautes are a well-known American football team located in the South of France.

Early years
Born and raised in Westfield, Cheek played his high school football at Westfield High School, where he was an all-conference quarterback.

Professional career
Cheek was signed in 2001 by the San Francisco 49ers as an undrafted free agent out of  Humboldt State University, where he also played quarterback in addition to performing punting duties.

He has spent time in training camps with the 49ers, the Philadelphia Eagles, the New York Giants, and the Houston Texans (who traded him to the Chiefs for a 7th round pick after the preseason), and the Carolina Panthers.

He also participated in NFL Europa with the Berlin Thunder in 2003 and Cologne Centurions in 2004. The Chiefs were the first NFL team that he saw regular season action with.

Recently he has been signed by French football team Argonautes d'Aix-en-Provence as offensive assistant coach and special teams coach.

References

1977 births
Living people
American football punters
Berlin Thunder players
Cologne Centurions (NFL Europe) players
Kansas City Chiefs players
People from Westfield, New Jersey
Players of American football from New Jersey
Sportspeople from Union County, New Jersey
Westfield High School (New Jersey) alumni